The Great Lakes Curling Association is a regional association of the United States Curling Association encompassing the states of Michigan, Ohio, Indiana, Kentucky and parts of Tennessee.

Member Clubs

References

External links 

 Great Lakes Curling Association
 United States Curling Association

Curling governing bodies in the United States